Mariposa County is a county located in the U.S. state of California. As of the 2020 U.S. Census, the population was 17,131. The county seat is Mariposa. It is located in the western foothills of the Sierra Nevada mountains, north of Fresno, east of Merced, and southeast of Stockton.

The county's eastern section is the central portion of Yosemite National Park.

There are no incorporated cities in Mariposa County; however, there are communities recognized as census-designated places for statistical purposes. It also has the distinction of having no actual traffic signals anywhere in the county.
(The only other counties in California with no incorporated cities are Alpine and Trinity.)

History
Mariposa County was one of the original counties of California, created at the time of statehood in 1850. While it began as the state's largest county, territory that was once part of Mariposa was ceded over time to form all or part of twelve other counties, including all of Merced, Madera, Fresno, Tulare, Kings, and Kern; and parts of San Benito, Mono, Inyo, San Bernardino, and Los Angeles.  Thus, Mariposa County is known as the "Mother of Counties".

Mariposa County's original seat was a now-nonexistent hamlet known as Agua Fria (Spanish for "cold water"), about 3 miles directly west of Mariposa proper on Agua Fria Road, which runs from Highway 140 to the south, to the community of Mt. Bullion to the northwest.  Charles Fremont moved the county seat to Mariposa in 1854, resulting in the construction of the Mariposa County Courthouse, whose grounds occupies an entire block.  The historic structure is fronted by Bullion Street; Jones Street is to the rear, with 9th and 10th Streets on either side.  This handsome, white judicial building erected with whip-sawed wood from nearby forests is the oldest courthouse still in use in California: cases are still tried there to this day.  The courthouse is so recognizable that its likeness is on the Mariposa County Seal.  Also particularly noteworthy is the courthouse's clock tower and bell, which chimes every hour, on the hour, 24 hours a day, 7 days a week.

The county took its name from Mariposa Creek, which was so named by Spanish explorers in 1806, when they discovered a great cluster of butterflies ("mariposas" in Spanish and Portuguese) in the foothills of the Sierra. Each year, the first weekend in May, residents mark the annual arrival of migrating monarch butterflies with a "Butterfly Days" festival and parade.

Gold Rush

Mariposa County is located at the southern end of California's Mother Lode region. During the California Gold Rush, great quantities of the prized mineral were found and extracted, first in local stream-beds and later in hard rock mines. One of the most notable beneficiaries of this wealth was the famed explorer and 1856  Republican presidential candidate, John Charles Frémont, for whom the local hospital and Charles Street (more commonly known as "Highway 140") are named. Jessie Street, in the town of Mariposa, is named for Fremont's wife, Jessie Benton Frémont, who came to Mariposa with her husband on many extended visits although they never took up permanent residence within the county.

Many aspects of the area's mining history are depicted in exhibits at two local museums: the Mariposa History Museum, located in the town of Mariposa; and the California Mining and Mineral Museum, located at the Mariposa Fairgrounds (2 miles east of Mariposa on Highway 49).

Two small gold mines in Mariposa County, the Mockingbird mine and the Colorado Quartz mine, intermittently produce world-class (and very expensive) specimens of crystalline gold for mineral collectors. "Specimens from these occurrences commonly have bright luster and rich color, with well-developed crystals in unusual and attractive arrangements."  The best-known example is "The Dragon", now on display at the Houston Museum of Natural Science.

Geography
Along the banks of the Merced River is found the sole habitat for the limestone salamander, a rare species endemic to Mariposa County.

Adjacent counties
 Tuolumne County - north
 Madera County - southeast
 Merced County - southwest
 Stanislaus County - west
 Mono County - east

National protected areas
 Sierra National Forest (part)
 Stanislaus National Forest (part)
 Yosemite National Park (part)

Demographics

2020 census

Note: the US Census treats Hispanic/Latino as an ethnic category. This table excludes Latinos from the racial categories and assigns them to a separate category. Hispanics/Latinos can be of any race.

2014
The largest self-reported ancestry groups in Mariposa County were English (14.5%), German (13.7%), Irish (13.1%), Italian (4.1%), "American" (3.8%), Scottish (3.2%) and Portuguese (3.0%).

2011

Places by population, race, and income

2010 Census
The 2010 United States Census reported that Mariposa County had a population of 18,251. The racial makeup of Mariposa County was 16,103 (88.2%) White, 138 (0.8%) African American, 527 (2.9%) Native American, 204 (1.1%) Asian, 26 (0.1%) Pacific Islander, 508 (2.8%) from other races, and 745 (4.1%) from two or more races.  Hispanic or Latino of any race were 1,676 persons (9.2%).

2000
As of the census of 2000, there were 17,130 people, 6,613 households, and 4,490 families residing in the county.  The population density was 12 people per square mile (5/km2).  There were 8,826 housing units at an average density of 6 per square mile (2/km2).  The racial makeup of the county was 88.9% White, 0.7% Black or African American, 3.5% Native American, 0.7% Asian, 0.1% Pacific Islander, 2.7% from other races, and 3.4% from two or more races.  7.8% of the population were Hispanic or Latino of any race. 17.8% were of German, 13.4% English, 12.7% Irish and 6.7% American ancestry according to Census 2000. 96.0% spoke English and 3.5% Spanish as their first language.

There were 6,613 households, out of which 25.6% had children under the age of 18 living with them, 55.8% were married couples living together, 8.0% had a female householder with no husband present, and 32.1% were non-families. 26.5% of all households were made up of individuals, and 11.2% had someone living alone who was 65 years of age or older.  The average household size was 2.37 and the average family size was 2.86.

In the county, the population was spread out, with 21.6% under the age of 18, 6.9% from 18 to 24, 25.1% from 25 to 44, 29.2% from 45 to 64, and 17.2% who were 65 years of age or older.  The median age was 43 years. For every 100 females there were 104.7 males.  For every 100 females age 18 and over, there were 105.4 males.

The median income for a household in the county was $34,626, and the median income for a family was $42,655. Males had a median income of $31,194 versus $25,440 for females. The per capita income for the county was $18,190.  About 10.5% of families and 14.8% of the population were below the poverty line, including 16.5% of those under age 18 and 9.0% of those age 65 or over.

Government 

The Government of Mariposa County is defined and authorized under the California Constitution and law as a general law county. The County government is composed of the Board of Supervisors, which has legislative and executive power.  It is composed of five members elected from the five separate districts of the county, on a non-partisan basis, to serve four-year staggered terms.

State and federal representation 

Politics 
In its early history Mariposa was one of the most reliable Democratic counties in California. Along with Colusa County, it was one of only two counties in the Pacific States to support Alton B. Parker in 1904. Over time, however, the county has steadily moved away from its Democratic roots, seen demonstrably in 1948 when Thomas E. Dewey won Mariposa without carrying California, as part of a trend turning the Great Basin into a rock-solid Republican stronghold. Currently Mariposa is a strongly Republican county in Presidential and congressional elections. The last Democrat to win a majority in the county was Lyndon Johnson in 1964 but the last Democrat to win Mariposa was Bill Clinton in 1992 who won a plurality of forty-one votes.

  
  
  
  
  
  
  
  
  
  
  
  
  
  
  
  
  
  
  
  
  
  
  
  
  
  
  
  
  
  
  

On Nov. 4, 2008, Mariposa County voted 62.1% for Proposition 8 which amended the California Constitution to ban same-sex marriages.

Voter registration

Crime 

The following table includes the number of incidents reported and the rate per 1,000 persons for each type of offense.

Healthcare
Mariposa County has one hospital, John C. Fremont Hospital.

According to a 2013 study, Mariposa County had the highest rate of child abuse and neglect, and as recently as 2014, had the second highest of rate of unvaccinated children in the state of California.

Media
Mariposa County primarily receives the major Fresno TV and radio stations.

The county also has media outlets that serve the local community. These include:
 Mariposa Gazette
 Sierra Sun Times

Transportation

Major highways
 State Route 41
 State Route 49
 State Route 120
 State Route 140

Public transportation
Mariposa County Transit provides dial-a-ride and some fixed route service
Yosemite Area Regional Transportation System (YARTS) provides service along State Routes 120 and 140 to Yosemite National Park.

Airports
Mariposa-Yosemite Airport is a general aviation airport. The nearest airports with scheduled flights are in Fresno and Merced.

Communities

Census-designated places

Bear Valley
Bootjack
Buck Meadows
Catheys Valley
Coulterville
Crane Creek
El Portal
Fish Camp
Greeley Hill
Hornitos
Lake Don Pedro
Mariposa (county seat)
Midpines
Mount Bullion
Wawona
Yosemite Valley
Yosemite West

Unincorporated communities
Foresta
Jerseydale
Lushmeadows
Oak Grove Estates

Population ranking

The population ranking of the following table is based on the 2010 census of Mariposa County.

† county seat

See also 
 List of school districts in Mariposa County, California
National Register of Historic Places listings in Mariposa County, California
 Valley and Sierra Miwok people
 Yokuts people (Mariposan)

Notes

References

Further reading

 A Memorial and Biographical History of the Counties of Merced, Stanislaus, Calaveras, Tuolumne and Mariposa, California. Chicago: Lewis Publishing Co., 1892.

External links

Mariposa County Chamber of Commerce
Yosemite / Mariposa County Tourism Bureau
Daily News and Photos of Mariposa County
 History and Genealogy of Mariposa County 
Mockingbird mine crystalline gold discovery, c. 2006, includes photo gallery

 
California counties
1850 establishments in California
Populated places established in 1850
California Gold Rush